Carodista fabajuxta is a moth in the family Lecithoceridae. It was described by Chun-Sheng Wu and Kyu-Tek Park in 1999. It is found in Sri Lanka.

The wingspan is about 18 mm. The forewings are ochreous brown with a brownish pattern, with distinct dots at the fold and the cell, as well as a distinct discocellular dot. The hindwings are ochreous.

Etymology
The species name is derived from Latin faba (meaning bean) and juxta.

References

Moths described in 1999
Carodista